Canopy Bridge connects two or more large trees on either sides of the road to facilitate the crossing of wildlife especially primates from one part of the forest to the other and help mitigate roadkills. The canopy bridge at Puduthotam at Valparai is a good example of canopy bridge installed by Nature conservation foundation and Anamalai Tiger reserve to mitigate roadkill of the endangered and endemic Lion-tailed macaque.

See also

Nutty Narrows Bridge

References

Bridges by structural type